This is a list of known humanitarian aid, that has and will be provided to Ukraine during the Russo-Ukrainian War. This list does not include financial support to the Ukrainian government unless earmarked for humanitarian purposes. For military aid see: List of military aid to Ukraine during the Russo-Ukrainian War.



Sources

Sovereign countries

European Union 

Individual EU member states have provided aid since 2014. The following list is the aid collectively provided by the EU. Most of this aid has been coordinated by the European Commission.

 €500 million in humanitarian aid, announced on 1 March 2022.
 In March 2022, a total of 10,000 free beds from hospitals in the EU were "reserved" for Ukrainians and the first war casualties from Ukraine were transported to various hospitals in the union.
 At least 1000 Ukrainian civilians evacuated for medical treatment in hospitals across the union so far.
 At least 5 million Ukrainian refugee civilians housed in the EU through a Temporary Protection Directive.
 5.5 Million Potassium Iodide tablets provided to Ukraine though the EU Emergency Response Coordination Centre.

Companies 

More than 100 companies have taken actions in support of Ukraine, including boycotts, in February and March 2022.

Other parties 

 Citizens of Japan donated $35 million.
 Rakuten founder Hiroshi Mikitani pledged to donate ¥1 billion ($8.7 million) to humanitarian victims in Ukraine on 27 February.
 The government of Artsakh Republic sent 14 tons of humanitarian aid in March 2022.
 Citizens of Taiwan donated $945 million NTD (US$33 million) as of 2 April 2022.
 Citizens of South Korea have so far donated $3 million directly to the Ukrainian Embassy in Seoul.
 Numerous Korean celebrities have donated to Ukraine. Lee Young-ae and Han Ji-min have each donated ₩100 million (approx. $87,000). Others including Narsha, Yang Dong-geun, U-KISS, Im Si-wan, Kim Eun-hee, Jang Hang-jun, etc. as well as Korean politicians have also donated varying sums.
 KOMCA (Korea Music Copyright Association) has donated ₩70 million (approx. $61,000) to assist Ukrainian musicians and artists who have become refugees, as well as those artists who have had to stay in Ukraine to fight and are now forced to witness the destruction of Ukrainian cultural heritage caused by the Russian invasion.
 Other charities and NGOs such as Come Back Alive, the Hope Bridge Korea Disaster Relief Association, the Seoul-based Good Neighbors International, UNICEF, Save the Children, etc. have also received significant donations from Korean citizens.
 Citizens globally have provided 11.6 billion UAH to special NBU multi-currency fundraising accounts and over $21 million in cryptocurrency, as of 1 March 2022.
 United Hatzalah of Israel sent a team of 55 medical personnel, doctors, paramedics, and EMTs, on a rotation basis to assist Ukrainian refugees in Moldova by providing free medical treatment and humanitarian aid to refugees. The EMS organization then began using its Ukrainian based volunteers as well as those who came from Israel, to deliver food and medical supplies to hospitals and medical clinics inside Ukraine, while extricating injured and ill people out of Ukraine to receive care in other countries. They airlifted 3,000 Ukrainian refugees to Israel in an operation codenamed Operation Orange Wings.
 Many Airbnb users across the globe have booked thousands of apartments in Ukraine, though they have no intention to visit the country.
 Bunq CEO Ali Niknam stated to create a specialized fund to support Ukrainian refugees to get to the Netherlands under a highly skilled migrant visa.
 In the United Kingdom, the Disasters Emergency Committee, an umbrella group of 15 British charities, launched a public appeal for humanitarian aid to Ukraine on 4 March 2022. It raised £55 million ($72.5 million) in the first day, including personal donations from the British royal family. By 17 March, £200 million had been raised. A televised fundraising concert for the appeal on 29 March called Concert for Ukraine raised a further £13.4 million within 24 hours.
 In Germany, €752 million have been donated (as of End of April 2022) according to a survey by the "German Center for Social Affairs" ("DZI") among 67 aid groups including the three fundraising campaigns Aktion Deutschland Hilft, "Bündnis Entwicklung Hilft" and "Aktionsbündnis Katastrophenhilfe".
 Netflix co-founder Reed Hastings announced a $1 million donation to Razom, a Ukrainian NGO.
 In March 2022, a donation-financed airlift called Ukraine Air Rescue was established under the umbrella of the non-profit German organization European Danube Academy ("Europäische Donau-Akademie"), with more than 100 pilots participating, delivering medical supplies to the Polish-Ukrainian border.
 Citizens of Finland had donated nearly €60 million to fundraising campaigns organized by the Finnish Red Cross, Finnish Committee for UNICEF, and Finn Church Aid by 19 May 2022.
 In addition to private donations, numerous American states and local law enforcement agencies are donating surplus protective equipment through the Ukrainian American Coordinating Council and other organizations.
 As of 10 April 2022, Dutch people had donated €160.8 million for Ukraine via a fundraising campaign called Giro 555 with one fire brigade donating seven fire trucks on 30 April.
 The Serbian Orthodox Church has decided to send all the donations collected in the churches to the Ukrainian Orthodox Church Citizens of Novi Sad donated clothes, food, blankets, adult diapers The National Council of the Ukrainian national minority in Serbia has initiated an action to collect aid for the war-endangered people of Ukraine, and the action is being carried out in several places in Vojvodina. The Red Cross of Serbia has opened a dedicated account to which Serbian citizens can pay monetary donations to help the endangered population of Ukraine. Serbian Chamber of Commerce asks companies from Serbia to help Ukraine. Big companies had responded, including MK Group, Nestlé Adriatic, Elixir Group, and Tobacco Industry Senta, adding that Coca-Cola HBC – Srbija and Bambi had also pledged to help.
 "Blue/Yellow" charity in Lithuania, dedicated for supporting Ukraine, collected over €22.9 million (as of 30 March) from the citizens of Lithuania.
 On 30 May 2022 Lithuanian citizens raised €5 million for the crowdfunded purchase of a Bayraktar TB2 armed UAV for the Ukrainian military, the drone was subsequently, given to Lithuania by Baykar Tech free of charge, with the €6 million collected used for aid. It reached Ukraine on July 8, 2022.
 Lithuanian civilians also crowdfunded 7 Estonian made EOS C VTOl reconnaissance drones (two of which were crowdfunded in early May, with the other five being later purchased with the money collected from the TB2 crowdfunder), 110 Lithuanian-made EDM4S Sky Wiper anti drone weapons, 37 WB Electronics Warmates (including launch/control equipment and ammunition), and 18 UJ-23 Topazs for the Ukrainian military.
 On 21 June 2022 Russian journalist Dmitry Muratov auctioned off his Nobel Prize medal for $103.5 million to be donated to UNICEF's Humanitarian Response for Ukrainian Children Displaced by War.
 11 August 2022, various fire departments in and around the San Francisco Bay area donated enough fire fighting equipment to fill a forty-foot shipping container to be shipped Poland and then distributed in Ukraine.
 $1.2 million raised for the Ukraine Crisis Relief Fund by the US Open Tennis Plays for Peace exhibition.

Beer for Ukraine 
At the beginning of the invasion, Ukrainian brewery Pravda Beer Theatre, stopped brewing beer and started making Molotov cocktails. However the brewery shares their recipes and artwork to craft breweries worldwide to start making their beer and asked, if they do so, to make donations to their relief fund efforts. Many beer breweries worldwide began producing special beers whose proceeds would be donated to Ukraine, and spoke out against Putin's illegal actions. A number of breweries including Boston Beer Company brew the Resolve beer brand which donates all of its proceeds to Ukraine. The Boston Beer Company also donated $50,000 to World Central Kitchen, which provides prepared meals in Ukraine. Other breweries are brewing beer where (a part of) the revenue is donated to Ukraine, as shown on the website brewforukraine.beer. Also Untappd started a campaign to support Ukrainian beers.

Appealed and pledged by United Nations 
The UN Office for the Coordination of Humanitarian Affairs made an appeal for $1.7 billion in aid to the 2022 Ukrainian refugee crisis – including $1.1 billion in humanitarian aid to Ukraine – on 1 March 2022.
United Nations's under-Secretary-General for Humanitarian Affairs and Emergency Relief Coordinator Martin Griffiths announced that $1.5 billion had been pledged.

Other responses 
Initially, a Kawasaki C-2 of the Japan Self Defence Force had been given permission to land and fly on to the UAE, for carrying aid from India and Singapore. India responded that only civilian planes are allowed to deliver aid. This forced Japan to change how it delivered its humanitarian aid.

Taiwan has kept mainly to humanitarian and financial aid.

See also 

 Ukraine Democracy Defense Lend-Lease Act of 2022
 Corporate responses to the 2022 Russian invasion of Ukraine

Invasion 

 Prelude to the 2022 Russian invasion of Ukraine
 2022 Russian invasion of Ukraine
 Timeline of the 2022 Russian invasion of Ukraine

Reactions 

 Government and intergovernmental reactions to the 2022 Russian invasion of Ukraine
 Potential enlargement of NATO
 Potential enlargement of the European Union
 Protests against the 2022 Russian invasion of Ukraine
 Reactions to the 2021–2022 Russo-Ukrainian crisis
 Reactions to the 2022 Russian invasion of Ukraine

Sanctions, boycotts, censorship and cyberwarfare 

 2022 boycott of Russia and Belarus
 International sanctions during the Russo-Ukrainian War
 List of companies that applied sanctions during the Russo-Ukrainian War
 Russian–Ukrainian cyberwarfare

Humanitarian crisis 

 2022 Ukrainian refugee crisis
 Casualties of the Russo-Ukrainian War
 War crimes in the 2022 Russian invasion of Ukraine

Equipment 

 List of Russo-Ukrainian conflict military equipment

Notes

References

External links 

 "Ukraine Support Tracker – A Database of Military, Financial and Humanitarian Aid to Ukraine" by the Kiel Institute for the World Economy

Ukraine
Ukraine
Foreign relations of Ukraine
Reactions to the 2022 Russian invasion of Ukraine